The Monkeys (formerly Three Drunk Monkeys) is a creative agency based in Sydney, Australia. Founded in 2006 by Justin Drape, Scott Nowell and Mark Green, they now employ over 130 full-time staff. The Monkeys create ideas that live within advertising, entertainment and technology. Clients include The University of Sydney, Telstra, IKEA, UBank and Parmalat.

Notable projects

Thrive On

The Monkeys has numerous big brands on its books but this year's relaunch for Telstra marks among its biggest work to date. The fully integrated campaign shows how Telstra enables people to thrive in a connected world, effectively moving the brand from a 'telco' to a 'techco'. To highlight this point is a quote from renowned science fiction writer and futurist Arthur C. Clarke with the film also featuring a voice-over form slam poetry champion Phil Wilcox and soundtrack from Aussie band Flight Facilities.

Richie's BBQ

After picking up MLA's lamb portfolio, The Monkey's 2015 installment of its iconic Australia Day campaign was the brand's most successful ever ad. The agency designed the ultimate Australia Day barbecue hosted by cricket legend Richie Benaud and featuring Aussies from Captain Cook to Ita Buttrose.

Homer Hudson

Working with its design agency Maud, The Monkeys grabbed headlines across the country by relaunching iconic Australian ice cream brand Homer Hudson. At one point it was available in more than 800 Woolworths stores in Australia and proved that the agency was more than willing to work outside the boundaries.

Intelligent Sounds, featuring Flume

Intelligent Sounds is an experimental film project created by The Monkeys, in collaboration with Flume and Intel, which launched on 26 September 2013. Including music, technology and advertising, the film features a band of robots performing a soundtrack performed by Flume, who was named one of Fuse TV's "30 must-see artists" at SXSW in 2013.

Airbnb IKEA

In what was the first Airbnb collaboration in the world, The Monkeys helped IKEA turn the spotlight on its bedrooms and bathrooms by allowing Australian families to spend the night in IKEA Tempe. It picked up global attention across Time Magazine, Daily Mail and Huffington Post among others.

Stay Living

This series of graphic short films was shot in Sydney in 2013 and follows a group of friends who 'Stay Living' through a zombie apocalypse. Created by The Monkeys as branded entertainment for Boost Mobile, the films won the Grand Prix at the 2013 APAC Branded Content & Entertainment Awards.

Mixionary.com

The Mixionary.com platform is presentation for Diageo on cocktails and mixed drinks, breaking down each cocktail into separate steps. A series of Mixionary posters (designed by Maud) won a Yellow Pencil at D&AD 2013.

Reverse Robberies

After a change in ownership left Oak (Parmalat) milk without distribution, The Monkeys created a series of videos purporting to be footage of "reverse robberies": mask-wearing robbers raiding convenience stories to stock the shelves with Oak. It used Facebook to seed the idea and then to execute the campaign.

KLIPPBOK

KLIPPBOK (Swedish for 'scrapbook') is a scrapbooking app that allows people to browse IKEA products and experiment with home decorating. Since its launch in November 2012, KLIPPBOK has been downloaded 50,000 times in 100 countries, and featured at SXSW 2013 in an interactive project.

The Ship Song Project

To promote the cultural importance of the Sydney Opera House, The Monkeys collaborated with musicians Neil Finn, Kev Carmody, Sarah Blasko, John Bell, Martha Wainwright, Katie Noonan, Paul Kelly, Teddy Tahu Rhodes, The Temper Trap and Daniel Johns, along with Opera Australia, the Australian Ballet, Bangarra Dance Theatre, the Sydney Symphony Orchestra and the Australian Chamber Orchestra to perform and record a reinterpretation of The Ship Song by Nick Cave.

The performances were filmed by award-winning director Paul Goldman and music director and arranger Elliot Wheeler in the rehearsal rooms and backstage areas of the Sydney Opera House, and edited into a single rolling shot through the Opera House.

The Ship Song Project was released as an online film on 26 July 2011, and shared across traditional and social media channels.

The Ship Song was released as a single and reached number 34 on the iTunes Pop Charts.

A "making of" documentary was filmed by Greg Appel, director of Australian documentaries Long Way to the Top and Bombora, voiced by Guy Pearce and aired on Foxtel on 11 August 2011.

:30 Seconds (TV series) 
Created and written by Justin Drape, Scott Nowell, Tim Bullock and Andrew Knight and produced by Andrew Denton's production company Zapruder's Other Films Pty Ltd, :30 Seconds is an Australian comedy series which satirises Australian advertising companies and the advertising industry. It first aired on Foxtel's Comedy Channel in 2009.
The cast included Stephen Curry, Peter O’Brien, Joel Tobeck, Gyton Grantley and Kat Stewart. :30 Seconds received AFI, AWGIES and Logie Award nominations.

The Cancer Council - Sun Sound 
To promote skin cancer prevention The Monkeys worked with musician Ben Lee to create a simple melody that is now played at beaches, schools, sports grounds and pools, reminding people to protect themselves from the sun.

The Gruen Transfer 
The Gruen Transfer is a TV show about advertising created by Zapruder's Other Films Pty Ltd, and broadcast on the ABC. The Monkeys created three TV commercials for fictional products: Gruen Beer, Gruen Bank and Gruen Beauty that also aired on Australia’s commercial-free, taxpayer funded channel ABC. There was an immediate public outcry.

Guide Dogs NSW/ ACT 
A multi-channel campaign created with Curious Films and Director Paola Morabito featured interviews with human candidates applying for a role that requires the same job dedication that is expected of a successful guide dog.

BBC Knowledge 
The Monkeys and US based mixed-media Director Sean Pecknold from Grandchildren created two brand identity commercials for BBC Knowledge: Eat Up Brain which featured the voice of actor Richard E Grant, and "Honk If You’re Human" which was voiced by comedian Stephen K. Amos.

Kids For Life - I Can Do Anything 
A story book featuring figures from history including Muhammad Ali, Jacques Cousteau, Pablo Picasso, Amelia Earhart and Martin Luther King Jr. who overcame difficult odds. It has also been placed in the National Library of Australia. All profits from its sale go to the children's charity Kids for Life.

The Big Drink 
A sculpture that exhibited at Sculpture by the Sea, the world's largest outdoor sculpture exhibition. Created by Simone Brandse and Justin Drape it is constructed from 450 kg of steel and PVC. The 13-metre large-scale bendy straw stuck out from the ocean beside Bondi's popular coastal walk.

YouTube - Map My Summer 
People were encouraged to upload videos of their summer experiences to a website. Every upload was geolocated using Google API technology to create a map of summer where visitors could browse the video content.

Filmmaker George Miller and Screen Australia have since created a short film from the uploaded footage. The film premiered at the 2011 Sydney Film Festival in June 2011

The Map My Summer film was featured at the Tropfest short film festival.

My Family Feast 
An Australian television program co-written and produced by The Monkeys, Hopscotch Films and Benchmark Films. Hosted by chef Sean Connolly, the show first screened on SBS in 2009 and features the lives and cooking traditions of Australian immigrants and their families.
My Family Feast received awards at the 2010 World Food & Wine Festival and a 2010 Logie nomination.

Foxtel EOFYS 
This multimedia campaign promoted Foxtel's end of financial year sale and coined the acronym EOFYS which has since become commonly used  in the Australian vernacular, having been used by other retailers to promote their end of financial year sales.

Foxtel HD+ 
The campaign follows several generations of one family as they react to each new piece of technology, from the arrival of television in 1956 to Foxtel HD+ in the present day. The campaign was described by the CEO of Foxtel, Kim Williams as the most successful product launch in the history of Foxtel

Awards and recognition

In June 2016, The Monkeys took home Mumbrella TV Ad of The Year 2016 for MLA Australia Day Campaign.

In March 2016, The Monkeys were named AdNews Agency of the Year 2015, AdNews Independent Agency of the Year 2015 and AdNews NSW Agency of the Year 2015.

In February 2016, The Monkeys were crowned Campaign Brief Australian Agency of the Year 2015.

In December 2015, The Monkeys were named B&T Magazine Independent Agency of the Year 2015.

In June 2015, The Monkeys were named Mumbrella Creative Agency of the Year 2015.

In June 2015, The Monkeys took home Mumbrella TV Ad of the Year 2015 for MLA Australia Day campaign.
 
In November 2014, The Monkeys were named B&T Independent Agency of the Year 2014.

In March 2013, The Monkeys and design studio Maud formed a multi-discipline brand and design company.

In 2013, The Monkeys were named Ernst & Young Entrepreneur of the Year Award finalists and won Agency of the Year, NSW Agency of the Year and Independent Agency of the Year at the AdNews Agency of the Year Awards.

The Monkeys won Campaign Asia-Pacific Agency of the Year Awards Silver (2012); Australian Creative Hotshop of the Year (2011); B&T Agency of the Year (2011); B&T Grand Prix Communications Agency of the Year (2010); and AdNews Agency of the Year (2010). In 2007, The Monkeys were named AdNews and B&T’s Emerging Agency of the year.

The Monkeys has been awarded at international award shows including Cannes, D&AD, The One Show and Clio. Current clients include Parmalat, Telstra, Sydney Opera House, IKEA, Boost Mobile, Intel and UBank.

References

Advertising agencies of Australia
Companies based in Sydney
Marketing companies established in 2006
Australian companies established in 2006